Benjamin Bernard Flowers (born Benjamin Bernard Kwiatkowski, February 14, 1930April 14, 2011) was an American football player who played at the end position for the Purdue University where he became a consensus first-team All-American in 1952.  

Flowers was drafted by the Baltimore Colts in the second round (14th overall pick) of the 1953 NFL Draft but chose to play in Canada with the Ottawa Rough Riders, where his 9 touchdowns scored made him an all-star. He played one game for the Colts in 1956.

Early life
Born February 14, 1930, in Erie, Pennsylvania, Flowers was born Benjamin Bernard Kwiatkowski to a Polish family, and translated his last name to Flower ("kwiat" is Polish for flower). He attended Central Tech High School.

College career
Flowers continued his football career at Purdue University following his graduation from Tech. Flowers lettered 3 years for the Boilermakers, from 1950 to 1952. In 1952, Flowers helped lead the Boilermakers to a share of the Big Ten Conference title, and was named a Consensus All-American.

Professional career

Baltimore Colts
Flowers was drafted with the 14th overall selection in the 1953 NFL Draft.

Ottawa Rough Riders
Flowers choose not to play with the Colts in 1953, opting to play for the Ottawa Rough Riders of the Canadian Football League instead. Flowers posted 9 receiving touchdowns, and was named an East All Star.

Return to Baltimore
After serving in the U.S. Navy from 1954 to 1955, Flowers returned to professional football, appearing in one game with the Colts during the 1956 season.

See also
 1952 College Football All-America Team

References

External links
 Pro-football-reference
 Database football
 Purdue Sports article

1930 births
2011 deaths
Sportspeople from Erie, Pennsylvania
Players of American football from Pennsylvania
American football tight ends
American people of Polish descent
Purdue Boilermakers football players
All-American college football players
Baltimore Colts players
American players of Canadian football
Canadian football tight ends
Ottawa Rough Riders players